Adolph Simon Ochs (March 12, 1858 – April 8, 1935) was an American newspaper publisher and former owner of The New York Times and The Chattanooga Times (now Chattanooga Times Free Press).

Early life and career 
Ochs was born to a German Jewish family in Cincinnati, Ohio, on March 12, 1858. His parents, Julius Ochs and Bertha Levy, were both immigrants. His father had left Bavaria for the United States in 1846. Julius was a highly educated man and fluent in six languages, which he taught at schools throughout the South. He supported the Union during the Civil War. Ochs' mother Bertha, who had come to the United States in 1848 as a refugee from the revolution in Rhenish Bavaria, had lived in the South before her 1853 marriage to Julius. She sympathized with the South in the war, but their differing sympathies did not separate their household.

After the war, the family moved to Knoxville, Tennessee, in the eastern, Union-affiliated part of the state. In Knoxville, Adolph studied in the public schools and during his spare time delivered newspapers. At 11, he went to work at the Knoxville Chronicle as office boy to the editor William Rule, who became a mentor. In 1871 Ochs worked as a grocer's clerk in Providence, Rhode Island, attending a night school meanwhile. He returned to Knoxville, where he was a druggist's apprentice for some time. 

In 1872, Ochs returned to the Chronicle as a "printer's devil", who looked after various details in the composing room of the paper. His siblings also worked at the newspaper to supplement the income of their father, a lay religious leader for Knoxville's small Jewish community. The Chronicle was the only Republican, pro-Reconstruction, newspaper in the city, but Ochs counted Father Ryan, the Poet-Priest of the Confederacy, among his customers.

Chattanooga Times and The New York Times 

At the age of 19, he borrowed $250 from his family to purchase a controlling interest in the Chattanooga Times, becoming its publisher.  The following year he founded a commercial paper called The Tradesman. He was one of the founders of the Southern Associated Press and served as president. In 1896, at the age of 38, he was advised by The New York Times reporter Henry Alloway that the paper could be bought at a greatly reduced price due to its financial losses and wide range of competitors in New York City. After borrowing money to purchase the Times for $75,000, Ochs formed the New York Times Co., placed the paper on a strong financial foundation, and became the majority stockholder.

In 1904, Ochs hired Carr Van Anda as his managing editor.  Their focus on objective journalism, in a time when newspapers were openly and highly partisan, and a well-timed price decrease (from 3¢ per issue to 1¢) led to its rescue from near oblivion.  The paper's readership increased from 9,000 at the time of his purchase to 780,000 by the 1920s. He also added the Times well-known masthead motto: "All the News That's Fit to Print".

In 1904, Ochs moved the New York Times to a newly built building on Longacre Square in Manhattan, which the City of New York then renamed as Times Square. On New Year's Eve 1904, he had pyrotechnists illuminate his new building at One Times Square with a fireworks show from street level.

On August 18, 1921, the 25th anniversary of reorganization, the staff of The New York Times numbered 1,885. It was classified as an independent Democratic publication, and consistently opposed William Jennings Bryan in his presidential campaigns. By its fairness in the presentation of news, editorial moderation and ample foreign service, it secured a high place in American journalism, becoming widely read and influential throughout the United States.

Beginning with 1896, there was issued weekly a supplement, eventually called The New York Times Book Review and Magazine. Gradually other auxiliary publications were added: The Annalist, a financial review appearing on Mondays; The Times Mid-Week Pictorial on Thursdays; Current History Magazine, a monthly, started during World War I. The New York Times Index started in 1913 and was published quarterly; it compared only with the similar Index to London's The Times.

In 1901, Ochs became proprietor and editor of the Philadelphia Times, later merged in the Philadelphia Public Ledger, of which he was sole owner from 1902 to 1912, when he sold it to Cyrus H. K. Curtis.

According to Wolfgang Disch, it was during this time in 1916 that Ochs relayed one of his most famous quotes "I affirm that more than 50% of money spent on advertising is squandered and is a sheer waste of printers' ink." This quote might be the origin of the common marketing saying "I know half the money I spend on advertising is wasted, but I can never find out which half", which has been attributed to John Wanamaker.

Family and religious activities 
In 1884, Ochs married Effie Wise, a daughter of Rabbi Isaac Mayer Wise of Cincinnati, who was the leading exponent of Reform Judaism in America and the founder of Hebrew Union College.

In 1928 Ochs built the Mizpah Congregation Temple in Chattanooga in memory of his parents, Julius and Bertha Ochs. The Georgian colonial building was designated as a Tennessee Historical Preservation Site in 1979.

Ochs was engaged in fighting anti-Semitism. He was active in the early years of the Anti-Defamation League, serving as an executive board member, and used his influence as publisher of the New York Times to convince other newspapers nationwide to cease the unjustified caricaturing and lampooning of Jews in the American press.

Death and legacy

Ochs died on April 8, 1935, during a visit to Chattanooga. He is buried at the Temple Israel Cemetery in Hastings-on-Hudson, Westchester County, New York.

His only daughter, Iphigene Bertha Ochs, married Arthur Hays Sulzberger, who became publisher of the Times after Adolph died.  Her son-in-law Orvil Dryfoos was publisher from 1961 to 1963, followed by her son Arthur Ochs "Punch" Sulzberger.  Her daughter, Ruth Holmberg, became publisher of The Chattanooga Times. Ruth Holmberg's son is Arthur Golden, author of Memoirs of a Geisha. Ochs' great-grandson Arthur Ochs Sulzberger Jr. was publisher of The New York Times from 1992 until 2017.

One of his nephews, Julius Ochs Adler, worked at The New York Times for more than 40 years, becoming general manager in 1935, after Ochs died. Another nephew, John Bertram Oakes, the son of his brother George Washington Ochs Oakes, in 1961 became editorial page editor of the Times editorial page, which he edited until 1976. Ochs was inducted into the Junior Achievement U.S. Business Hall of Fame in 1982. Another nephew, Adolph Shelby Ochs, was treasurer and a director of The Chattanooga Times. He was married to Mrs. Theodosia Fitzgerald Gray of Danville, Virginia, granddaughter of Dan River Inc. founder T.B. Fitzgerald, niece of Wachovia Bank founder James Alexander Gray and cousin of Bowman Gray Sr., former president and chairman of R. J. Reynolds.

References
Informational notes

Citations

Further reading
Tifft, Susan E. and Jones, Alex S. (1999) The Trust: The Private and Powerful Family Behind The New York Times. New York: Little, Brown and Company 
"History of the ADL: 1913-1920 ADL - In Retrospect: 'Hang the Jew, Hang the Jew'

External links

"Adolph Ochs", Immigrant Entrepreneurship, 2012
Obituary, NY Times, April 9, 1935, "Adolph S. Ochs Dead at 77; Publisher of Times Since 1896"
Jewish Virtual Library - Adolph Ochs
Tennessee Encyclopedia of History and Culture article
Article in FAIR by John L. Hess assessing career

Adolph S. Ochs papers, Manuscripts and Archives Division, New York Public Library.
 

 

 
 

1858 births
1935 deaths
The New York Times publishers
American people of German-Jewish descent
19th-century American newspaper publishers (people)
Editors of Tennessee newspapers
People from Chattanooga, Tennessee
Anti-Defamation League members
People from Knoxville, Tennessee
American Reform Jews
Burials in New York (state)
People from Cincinnati
20th-century American newspaper publishers (people)